Fédération Internationale du Sport Automobile (FISA) was the sport governing body for motor racing events, in particular Formula One.  The organization's origins dated from 1922, when the Fédération Internationale de l'Automobile (FIA) delegated the organization of automobile racing to the Commission Sportive Internationale (CSI), which lasted until 1978 when Jean-Marie Balestre took over the reins and it was renamed FISA. A restructuring of the FIA in 1993 led to the disappearance of the FISA, putting motor racing under the direct management of the FIA.

Presidents

See also

FISA–FOCA war

References 

Auto racing organizations
 
Formula One
Motorsport governing bodies
1922 establishments in Europe
1922 establishments in Asia
1922 establishments in Africa
1922 establishments in North America
1922 establishments in South America
1922 establishments in Oceania
1993 disestablishments in Europe
1993 disestablishments in Asia
1993 disestablishments in Africa
1993 disestablishments in North America
1993 disestablishments in South America
1993 disestablishments in Oceania